Neferkare Amenemnisu was an ancient Egyptian pharaoh, the second king of the 21st Dynasty.

Reign
Amenemnisu's existence was only confirmed in 1940 when the Tanite tomb of his successor Psusennes I was discovered by Pierre Montet: a gold bow cap inscribed with both Amenemnisu's royal name, Neferkare, and that of his successor Psusennes I was found within the tomb. Previously, his existence had been doubted as no objects naming him had been discovered. However, the memory of his short rule as the second pharaoh of the 21st Dynasty was preserved in Manetho's Epitome as a king Nephercheres who is assigned a short reign of four years.

Pardon of rebellions
While his reign is generally obscure, the then High Priest of Amun at Thebes, Menkheperre, is known to have pardoned several leaders of a rebellion against the High Priest's authority during Amenemnisu's reign. These rebels had previously been exiled to the Western Oasis of Egypt in Year 25 of Smendes. These events are reported on the so-called Banishment Stela (Louvre C. 256), likely made during the brief reign of Amenemnisu.

See also
 List of pharaohs

References

11th-century BC Pharaohs
Pharaohs of the Twenty-first Dynasty of Egypt
1047 BC deaths
Year of birth unknown